The Macchi M.7 was an Italian single-seat fighter flying boat designed by Alessandro Tonini and built by Macchi. A modified version of the M.7, the M.7bis won the Schneider Trophy in 1921.

Development
The M.7 was similar to the earlier M.5 but had a modified hull and was powered by an Isotta Fraschini V.6 engine. Due to the end of World War I, only 17 aircraft were delivered to the Italian Navy. In 1919, two were sold to Argentina and four to Sweden, and in 1921, Brazil bought three.

In 1920, Tonini designed the M.7bis a racing version of the M.7 for the Schneider Trophy.  The M.7bis had a lighter structure and reduced-span wings. Five M.7s entered the 1921 competition at Venice, which was won by Giovanni di Briganti flying the M.7bis. At the 1922 competition at Naples, the M.7bis came in fourth.

In 1923, a revised variant of the M.7, the M.7ter appeared. This had a redesigned hull, revised wing configuration and a new tail unit. Three different versions of the M.7ter were built, including the M.7ter AR, which had folding wings to allow them to operate from the seaplane-carrier Giuseppe Miraglia. In 1924, six Italian naval squadrons were equipped with the M.7ter and over 100 were built. The aircraft was also used as late as 1940 by civilian flying schools.

Operators

Argentine Naval Aviation

Brazilian Naval Aviation

Regia Marina
Italian Naval Aviation

Paraguayan Air Force

Swedish Air Force

Surviving aircraft 
A single Macchi M.7 has survived to this day. It was built in Italy around 1918 and was used by the Swedish Air Force from 1921 to 1927. It is now on display in the Swedish Air Force Museum with Swedish insignia.

Specifications (M.7ter)

See also

References

 

Schneider Trophy
1910s Italian fighter aircraft
Flying boats
M.07
Biplanes
Single-engined pusher aircraft
Aircraft first flown in 1918